Maddison Inglis and Kaylah McPhee were the defending champions but chose not to participate.

Fernanda Contreras and Alycia Parks won the title, defeating Alison Bai and Alana Parnaby in the final, 6–3, 6–1.

Seeds

Draw

Draw

References

External Links
Main Draw

Bendigo International - Doubles